Athripsodes is a genus of insects in the family Leptoceridae.

The genus was described in 1820 by Gustaf Johan Billberg.

The genus has cosmopolitan distribution.

Species:
 Athripsodes albifrons (Linnaeus, 1758)
 Athripsodes amplexus (Barnard, 1934)
 Athripsodes angriamani Schmid, 1959

References

Trichoptera
Trichoptera genera